Shad Baghi (also Romanized as Shād Bāghī; also known as Shāh Bāghī) is a village in Ardalan Rural District, Mehraban District, Sarab County, East Azerbaijan Province, Iran. At the 2006 census, its population was 439, in 130 families.

References 

Populated places in Sarab County